Ficus retusa is a species of evergreen woody plant in the fig genus, native to the Malay Archipelago and Malesia floristic region. The species name has been widely mis-applied to Ficus microcarpa.

Description
Ficus retusa is a rapidly growing, rounded, broad-headed, evergreen shrub or tree that can reach  in height with an equal spread.

It has a gray to reddish bark dotted with small, horizontal flecks, called lenticels, that are used by woody plant species for supplementary gas exchange through the bark. The name is commonly used to refer to ornamental indoor plants (for example bonsai) widely cultivated in temperate regions, but such plants generally belong to another species, Ficus microcarpa.

F. retusa is commonly used as a beginner's bonsai.

Notes

retusa
Flora of Malesia
Indomalayan realm flora
Garden plants of Asia
Ornamental trees
Plants used in bonsai

fi:Malaganviikuna